Su Shun may refer to:

 Su Shun (Xiaoshan) (蘇順), style name Xiaoshan (孝山), Eastern Han Dynasty scholar
 Sushun (肅順; 1816–1861), style name Yuting (雨亭), Qing Dynasty noble and regent
 Su Shun (footballer) (苏顺; born 1994), Chinese male footballer